John Holroyd Bagley Jr. (November 26, 1832 – October 23, 1902) was an American politician and a United States representative from New York, serving two non-consecutive terms from 1875 to 1877, and from 1883 to 1885.

Biography
Born in Hudson, New York, Bagley attended the common schools. He married Lydia M. Wicht, and they had a daughter, Lydia Wicht.

Career
In 1852 Bagley went to California and engaged in mining and other pursuits. He returned to New York and engaged in steamboating on the Hudson River.  He settled in Catskill, Greene County and engaged in mercantile pursuits and the manufacture of leather. He was supervisor of the town of Catskill from 1860 to 1864.

Elected as a Democrat to the Forty-fourth Congress, Bagley was a U.S. Representative for the fifteenth district of New York. He served from March 4, 1875 to March 3, 1877. He was not a candidate for renomination in 1876 and resumed his former mercantile pursuits. He was then elected to the Forty-eighth Congress, holding office from March 4, 1883 to March 3, 1885.  During the Forty-eight Congress he was chairman of the Committee on Manufactures. Not a candidate for renomination in 1884, he engaged in banking and the insurance business and also served as vice president of the Catskill Mountain Railway Co.

Trustee of the village of Catskill, Bagley was also a member of the New York State Assembly (Greene Co.) in 1888. He was an unsuccessful candidate for election in 1896 to the Fifty-fifth Congress.

Death
Bagley died in Catskill, Greene County, New York, on October 23, 1902 (age 69). He is interred at Village Cemetery, Catskill, New York.

References

External links

1832 births
1902 deaths
People from Hudson, New York
People from Catskill, New York
American bankers
19th-century American railroad executives
Democratic Party members of the New York State Assembly
Democratic Party members of the United States House of Representatives from New York (state)
19th-century American politicians